Francis Edward Neenan (30 July 1914 – 8 September 1991) was an Australian rules footballer who played with North Melbourne in the Victorian Football League (VFL).

Neenan later served in the Volunteer Defence Corps of the Australian Army during World War II.

Notes

External links 

1914 births
1991 deaths
Australian rules footballers from Melbourne
North Melbourne Football Club players
Volunteer Defence Corps soldiers
People from Williamstown, Victoria
Military personnel from Melbourne